Funmakers Football Club is a St. Maartener football club based in the Philipsburg region. The club competes in the SMSA Senior League, the top tier of football in Sint Maarten.

Known players 
  Andre Knol
  Rick de Punder
  Kael Richards
  Naeco Drijvers

References 

Football clubs in Sint Maarten